Memphis Sound may refer to:

Memphis soul, a style of soul music developed in Memphis, Tennessee, during the late 1960s and early 1970s
The Memphis Sounds, an American basketball team from 1974 to 1975